Muslim memes or Islamic memes or Halal memes are one type of Internet meme which usually contain calls for adherence to Islamic religious teachings.

Most Muslim memes contain calls to adhere to Islamic teachings, or to stay away from prohibitions in Islam. In their presentation, it is not uncommon for Muslim memes to offend their readers in order to remind them of their religious duties.

Origin 
It is not known where the first Islamic memes were introduced. However, there are several types of Muslim memes that are known to have emerged earlier than others.

"Stay Halal Brother" 
One of the earliest representations of Islamic memes is the phrase "Stay halal brother" which is usually combined with a poster of the Indian Muslim preacher Zakir Naik or the starfish character Patrick Star.

SpongeBob SquarePants 
Some memes are made using Islamic words against the background of the animated film characters SpongeBob SquarePants. Trends like this can usually be found in Indonesia.

Usage 
Islamic memes can be found widely on social media such as Instagram, YouTube, WhatsApp, and others.

Feedback 
The majority of Muslims generally accept the use of Islamic memes as a means of introducing Islam to the world. Some information experts from Indonesia regard Islamic memes as a means of preaching religion in a practical and easy way.

See also 

 Humour in Islam
 Meme
 Image macro

Reference 

Memes
Internet memes
Islamic culture
Islam in culture